Check It is a 2016 American documentary film directed by Dana Flor and Toby Oppenheimer. The film explores African-American gay and transgender youths in Washington D.C. who founded their own gang for self-protection.

In July 2017, comedian Louis C.K., who saw the film at one of its original screenings and thought that the film was "funny and moving" and gave him "a lot to think about," made the film available for download or streaming on his website.

References

External links 
 
 

American documentary films
2016 documentary films
American LGBT-related films
Documentary films about LGBT topics
2016 LGBT-related films
Transgender-related documentary films
African-American LGBT-related films
2010s English-language films
2010s American films